Andrew Ernest Stoddart (11 March 1863 – 4 April 1915) was an English sportsman who played international cricket for England, and rugby union for England and the British Isles. He was a Wisden Cricketer of the Year in 1893.

He has the unique distinction in captaining England in three distinct sports; cricket, rugby union and Australian rules football.

Cricket career

Born in Westoe, South Shields, County Durham, England, he was the youngest son of a wine merchant, who moved the whole family to Marylebone, London, in 1877. Stoddart made his reputation in club cricket and was playing for Middlesex by 1885. He was a flamboyant right-handed batsman and a right arm medium pace bowler. He played 16 Test matches captaining England in eight games of which he won three, lost four and drew one. His 173 at Melbourne in 1894–95 was, for 80 years, the highest score by an England captain in Test cricket in Australia. Stoddart was also the first England captain to ask Australia to bat first, and the first to declare a Test innings closed.

When he was 23, just a year after his first-class debut, he was toying with the idea of giving up his amateur career in England to join his brother in Colorado.  His plans changed when he took the record for the highest ever score in cricket at the time with an innings of 485 for Hampstead against Stoics on 4 August 1886. No declarations were allowed in the game and the Stoics, living up to their name, fielded all day without a chance to bat.  Stoddart was seventh out, having batted six hours and ten minutes and clubbed one eight, three fives, and 64 fours. The runs were scored at a rapid pace – the score was 370 for 3 at lunch after 150 minutes of play. He made 207 for Hampstead in the next match three days later and on 9 August was playing for Middlesex and made 98, a grand total of 790 runs in a week.  Stoddart was a man with a great zest for life in his younger days.  He had danced then played cards until dawn before the Stoics game, batted almost through Hampstead's innings of 813, then played tennis, went to the theatre and turned in at 3 a.m.  His next innings was against Kent when he posted his maiden first-class century in scoring 116.

Seventy years later, David Frith used My Dear Victorious Stod as the title of his acclaimed biography of Stoddart.

Rugby career

Stoddart also played ten rugby union internationals for England, and captained England four times. During his footballing career, Stoddart was at the forefront of many rugby firsts. In 1888, with fellow cricketers Alfred Shaw and Arthur Shrewsbury he helped organise what became recognised as the first British Lions rugby union tour of Australia and New Zealand in 1888. The team played 55 matches, winning 27 of 35 rugby matches.  He took over the captaincy early in the tour when Robert L. Seddon drowned in a sculling accident.

In 1890, Stoddart became a founding member of the Barbarian F.C., the invitational rugby club. On 27 December that year, Stoddart was given the captaincy of the very first Barbarian team, in a game against Hartlepool Rovers.

Personal life
While on tour in Australia, Stoddart met Emily Luckham, also known as Ethel Elizabeth, a popular singer and reciter married to Bulletin journalist and Manly, New South Wales sporting identity, Robert Adams Luckham.  In 1901, Emily left for Europe, reportedly for the good of her voice.  She did not return, and her husband divorced her on grounds of desertion in 1903. She married Stoddart in 1906.

Later life
Stoddart and his wife lived in St John's Wood, London. He worked on the London Stock Exchange, then became secretary of Queen's Club. But like many wholehearted sportsmen, including fellow England captain, Arthur Shrewsbury, with whom he had opened the batting in Australia in 1893, he found life difficult after leaving the arena. In 1915, in failing health and burdened by debt he committed suicide, by firearm, in his bedroom in London. His remains lie in an unmarked grave in Radford, Coventry. A street in South Shields is named after him.

Legacy
A portrait painted by Henry Weigall Jr, of Stoddart batting and Gregor MacGregor keeping wicket, was given to the MCC in 1927 by W.H. Patterson, a MCC committee member.  The identity of the artist of the oil painting was only reaffirmed in 2018.  The picture regularly hangs in the Pavilion at Lord's.

Notes

References

External links

 Cricinfo page on Andrew Stoddart
 CricketArchive page on Andrew Stoddart
 

1863 births
1915 deaths
1915 suicides
A. E. Stoddart's XI cricketers
A. J. Webbe's XI cricketers
A. Priestley's XI cricketers
Barbarian F.C. players
Blackheath F.C. players
British & Irish Lions rugby union players from England
C. I. Thornton's XI cricketers
Cricketers from South Shields
Earl De La Warr's XI cricketers
East of England cricketers
England international rugby union players
England Test cricket captains
England Test cricketers
English cricketers of 1864 to 1889
English cricketers of 1890 to 1918
English cricketers
English rugby union players
Gentlemen cricketers
Gentlemen of England cricketers
Home Counties cricketers
I Zingari cricketers
Lord Londesborough's XI cricketers
Lyric Club cricketers
Married v Single cricketers
Marylebone Cricket Club cricketers
Middlesex cricket captains
Middlesex cricketers
North v South cricketers
Rugby union players from South Shields
Suicides by firearm in England
Wisden Cricketers of the Year
Suicides in Westminster